Duncan Davidson (born 5 July 1954) is a Scottish former footballer.

Playing career

Duncan Davidson was born in Elgin, Moray in 1954. He signed for Aberdeen in 1973 from Lewis United. In 1981, he moved to the USA where he played for Tulsa Roughnecks and Toronto Blizzard. In 1983, he joined Hong Kong club See Bee, where he remained for a year before returning to the UK to join English club Manchester City. He retired from the game in 1984 to become a financial advisor.

References

External links

1954 births
Living people
People from Elgin, Moray
Scottish footballers
Aberdeen F.C. players
Tulsa Roughnecks (1978–1984) players
Toronto Blizzard (1971–1984) players
Manchester City F.C. players
Scottish Football League players
English Football League players
Expatriate soccer players in the United States
Lewis United F.C. players
North American Soccer League (1968–1984) players
Association football forwards
Scottish expatriate sportspeople in the United States
Scottish expatriate footballers
Scottish expatriate sportspeople in Canada
Expatriate soccer players in Canada
Sportspeople from Moray